Messapicetus is an extinct genus of beaked whale from the Late Miocene. It currently holds two species, M. longirostris from the Tortonian of Italy and M. gregarius from the Pisco Formation of Peru. However, a third unnamed species is represented in the St. Marys Formation of Maryland known from fragmentary material. M. gregarius is sexually dimorphic, males having tusks which are hypothesized to have been used in intraspecific combat for mates as in extant (living) beaked whales.

References

Ziphiids
Miocene cetaceans
Fossil taxa described in 1992
Prehistoric cetacean genera